Aicuña is a municipality and hamlet in La Rioja Province in northwestern Argentina.

References

Populated places in La Rioja Province, Argentina